The 1999 Irish Masters was the twenty-fifth edition of the professional invitational snooker tournament, which took place from 21 to 28 March 1999. The tournament was played at Goffs in Kill, County Kildare, and featured twelve professional players.

Stephen Hendry won the tournament for the third time, defeating Stephen Lee 9–8 in the final.

Main draw

References

Irish Masters
Irish Masters
Irish Masters
Irish Masters